Kant Air Base ( Aviabaza Kant) is a military air base in Ysyk-Ata District of Chüy Region in Kyrgyzstan. It is located just south of Kant, around 20 km east of Bishkek and is home to the Russian Air Force's 999th Air Base.

History 
The history of the airfield in Kant goes back to 1941, when the Odessa Military Aviation School of Pilots was evacuated to Kyrgyzstan. The School had been formed by an order of the People's Commissar of Defence of the USSR dated February 23, 1941. After Operation Barbarossa, the German invasion of the Soviet Union beginning on June 22, 1941, the school stopped training sessions, and its cadets began to perform combat missions on I-15 aircraft to cover Odessa from air strikes by the Nazi German Luftwaffe. In July 1941, the aviation school moved to Stalingrad, and then to the suburbs of the city Frunze, where military pilots were trained for the front. During the war years, 1507 pilots were trained at the aviation school, 7 of which were awarded the title Hero of the Soviet Union.

Subsequently, in 1947, the school in Kyrgyzstan was renamed the Frunze Military Aviation School for Pilots of the USSR Air Force. 
A training Aviation Regiment was formed in 1951.

From 1956, the school also trained foreign pilots. Among its graduates were Egyptian former president Hosni Mubarak and the late Syrian president Hafez al-Assad, as well as India's Air Chief Marshal Dilbagh Singh, and South Yemen Brigadier Pilot Shakib Khobani. 

In 1992, following the dissolution of the Soviet Union, control of the air base was transferred to Kyrgyzstan.

Present-day Russian base 

In accordance with a bilateral agreement between Russia and Kyrgyzstan signed on 22 September 2003, the air base hosts Russian Air Force units. The official opening took place on 23 October 2003, making the facility the first new air base Russia opened abroad since 1991. The unit stationed there has been described as Russian Air Force's 5th Air and Air Defence Forces Army's 999th Air Base.

In December 2012, Kyrgyzstan agreed to lease the base to Russia for fifteen years (with an option for an automatic extension for an additional five years) after the Russian government agreed to reduce Kyrgyz debt by $500 million.

As of February 2023, the Russian forces at the airbase is equipped with Su-25SM ground-support aircraft, Mi-8MTV5-1 helicopters, Orlan-10 UAVs, as well as a unit of the military police and military traffic police.

References

External links
 
 Kant Air Base on the Russian Ministry of Defence site
 В Киргизии отметили годовщину со дня образования объединенной российской военной базы «Кант»
 Справка о базе на сайте посольства России в Киргизии
 Личному составу российской авиабазы «Кант» (Киргизия) придан статус неприкосновенности
 Кыргызская авиабаза «Кант» будет аэродром «подскока» для стратегической авиации России
 Соглашение между Российской Федерацией и Киргизской Республикой о статусе и условиях пребывания объединенной российской военной базы на территории Киргизской Республики
 Закроет ли Бишкек российскую авиабазу «Кант»?

Airports in Kyrgyzstan
Russian Air Force bases
Soviet Air Force bases
Chüy Region
Soviet Air Forces education and training
Military installations of Russia in other countries
Military airbases established in 1941